Federal Mines Safety Act of 1910 was a United States statute passed for the purposes of establishing the United States Bureau of Mines as a federal agency of the United States Department of the Interior. The Act of Congress authorized investigations of mining methods with an emphasis regarding the safety of miners while recovering combustible fossil fuels and confronting occupational dust exposure.

In 1897, the United States Geological Survey created a mining geology program providing geological studies of mining districts (e.g., Comstock Lode and Leadville mining district) and examinations relevant to efficient mining extraction technologies of fossil fuel and precious metal materials. The 1910 public law commissioned the United States Bureau of Mines to conduct future investigations of mining accidents exempting the United States Geological Survey.

The H.R. 13915 bill was passed by the 61st United States Congressional session and enacted into law by the 27th president of the United States William Taft on May 16, 1910.

Mining Accidents and Federal Regulation Law
The 1910 United States federal law was created as a result of mining disasters where significant human resources perished in underground mining accidents.

Federal Experimental Coal Mine Stations
On December 22, 1913, the 63rd United States Congress passed a public law authorizing the United States Treasury to contract the design and development of a Bureau of Mines experimental station within the vicinity of Pittsburgh, Pennsylvania.

See also

Safety Pioneers of Geologic Mining Industry

United States Legislation & Mining Industry

References

Open Flame Illumination & Underground Mining

External links
 
 
 
 
 
 
 
 
 

1910 in law
1910 in American law
61st United States Congress
Mine safety
Coal mining law